Fencing at the 1994 Asian Games was held in Hiroshima, Japan from October 3 to October 10, 1994.

Medalists

Men

Women

Medal table

References
 New Straits Times, October 3–11, 1994
 Results

External links
 www.ocasia.org

 
1994 Asian Games events
1994
Asian Games
1994 Asian Games